Głobino  (German Gumbin) is a village in the administrative district of Gmina Słupsk, within Słupsk County, Pomeranian Voivodeship, in northern Poland.

Before 1945 the area around Słupsk, where the village is located,  was part of Germany. Around 1784 Gumbin comprised a small farm estate, three farms, a watermill and all together 14 households.

During World War II, on March 8, 1945, the region was captured by the Red Army, and after the end of the war it became part of Poland. Most of the village's German inhabitants were expelled.

The village has a population of 448.

References

Villages in Słupsk County